In the parlance of the Pacific Northwest of the United States, June hogs were the largest Chinook salmon caught in the summer migratory runs of the fish. June hogs were said to be a line of supersalmon. These supersalmon were capable of swimming over  up the Columbia River and into Canada. The name "June hog" derives from the seasonality of the runs and their size.

It is said that these Chinook salmon had massive amounts of energy reserves. They also produced large amounts of offspring. Bob Heinith of the Columbia River Inter-Tribal Fish Commission stated that June hogs most likely migrated to the sea as very young fish before the age of one.

References

External links
 June hogs, Northwest Power and Conservation Council

Salmon
History of the Pacific Northwest